Pferdskopf is a 662.6 meter (2,174 feet) high mountain of Hesse, Germany.

At the summit of the mountain is a look-out tower. From 1895 to 1960 it was an 18 meter high tower made from steel and built by the Taunusklub, a regional rambling club. The current tower is 34 meter high and made from wood in the year 1987.

References

Mountains of Hesse
Mountains and hills of the Taunus